The TBS Akasaka ACT Theater is a theatre located in Akasaka, Minato, Tokyo, Japan. In September 2014 the theatre is showing Arthur Kopit's musical version of the Gaston Leroux classic, The Phantom of the Opera. The theater is dedicated to the stage production of Harry Potter and the Cursed Child from June 2022.

References

Tokyo Broadcasting System
Akasaka, Tokyo
Buildings and structures in Minato, Tokyo
Theatres in Tokyo
Theatres completed in 2008
2008 establishments in Japan